Kateryna Moskalova (born 14 February 1998) is a Ukrainian sambist. She is 2019 European Games silver medalist in women's sambo. She is also a multiple World and European championships medallist.

References 

1998 births
Living people
Ukrainian sambo practitioners
Sambo practitioners at the 2019 European Games
European Games medalists in sambo
European Games silver medalists for Ukraine